I.N.S. Telenews was an American news program aired on the now defunct DuMont Television Network from 1948 to 1949.

Broadcast history
Each episode was 15 minutes long, made by International News Service, and aired weekly, each Tuesday at 7:45 pm EST, immediately following Camera Headlines which aired Monday through Friday at 7:30pm. As its name indicated, its main source of news information was the International News Service.

DuMont had aired The Walter Compton News, first as a local show on WTTG on June 16, 1947, then on the DuMont network from August 25, 1947, until January 1948, at which point DuMont replaced Compton's newscast with I.N.S. Telenews and Camera Headlines. After the two shows' cancellation in 1949, DuMont would not return to a network newscast until The DuMont Evening News was launched in 1954.

Episode status
No recordings of I.N.S. Telenews are known to survive. The UCLA Film and Television Archive has earlier Hearst newsreel series, such as Hearst Metrotone News and News of the Day, and a later series of Hearst newsreels syndicated to television called Telenews (1954-1962). Possibly some episodes of I.N.S. Telenews exist in these other collections. (Note: A Telenews item can be found on YouTube under the title "NHL 52-53 First Beliveau's game for Habs".)

See also
Camera Headlines
The Walter Compton News
DuMont Evening News
Television news in the United States
List of programs broadcast by the DuMont Television Network
List of surviving DuMont Television Network broadcasts
1948-49 United States network television schedule

References

Bibliography
David Weinstein, The Forgotten Network: DuMont and the Birth of American Television (Philadelphia: Temple University Press, 2004) 
Alex McNeil, Total Television, Fourth edition (New York: Penguin Books, 1980) 
Tim Brooks and Earle Marsh, The Complete Directory to Prime Time Network TV Shows, Third edition (New York: Ballantine Books, 1964)

External links
 
DuMont history website

DuMont Television Network original programming
1948 American television series debuts
1949 American television series endings
1940s American television news shows
Black-and-white American television shows
English-language television shows
Lost television shows
DuMont news programming